The Caesars Sportsbook Del Mar Derby  is an American thoroughbred horse race run annually during the first week of September at Del Mar Racetrack in Del Mar, California. A Grade II race open to three-year-old horses, it is contested on turf  over a distance of one and one-eighth miles (9 furlongs).

Inaugurated in 1945 as the Quigley Memorial Handicap at a distance of  miles on dirt, it was renamed in 1948, modified to its present distance in 1950, and moved to turf in 1970. It was raced in two divisions in 1963, in 1970, and again in 2013.  In 2013, 24 sophomores passed the entry box so the race had to be split into two divisions.

In 1968 there was a dead heat for the win.

In 2021, the race was presented for the first time by Caesars Sportsbook.

Records
Speed  record: (on turf at  miles) 
 1:45.85 – Willow O Wisp (2005)

Most wins by an owner:
 3 – Howard B. Keck (1960, 1962, 1966)
 3 – (Glen Hill Farm)  (1973, 1979, 2011)

Most wins by a jockey:
 5 – Laffit Pincay Jr. (1979, 1980, 1982, 1990, 1994)
 5 – Eddie Delahoussaye (1984, 1986, 1987, 1992, 2000)

Most wins by a trainer:
 4 – Julio C. Canani (1988, 1998, 1999, 2004)

Winners

* † In 1990, Tight Spot finished first, but was disqualified and set back to tenth place. That ruling was contested and later was overturned by the California Horse Racing Board and his victory reinstated.

References
 The 2009 Del Mar Derby at the NTRA

Del Mar Racetrack
Horse races in California
Graded stakes races in the United States
Flat horse races for three-year-olds
Turf races in the United States
Recurring sporting events established in 1945
1945 establishments in California